The 1785 Vermont Republic gubernatorial election took place throughout September, and resulted in the re-election of Thomas Chittenden to a one-year term.

The Vermont General Assembly met in Windsor on October 13. The Vermont House of Representatives appointed a committee to examine the votes of the freemen of Vermont for governor, lieutenant governor, treasurer, and members of the governor's council.

In the race for governor, Thomas Chittenden was re-elected to a one-year term, his eighth. In the election for lieutenant governor, Paul Spooner was chosen for a fourth one-year term. No candidate for treasurer obtained a majority. In accordance with the Vermont Constitution, the Vermont General Assembly was required to make a selection. On October 14, the Assembly (Vermont House of Representatives, governor, and governor's council) re-elected Ira Allen to his eighth one-year term as treasurer. The names of candidates and balloting totals were not recorded.

Results

References

Vermont gubernatorial elections
1785 in Vermont
1785 elections in North America